Alexandr Shefer (born 28 August 1971) is a former Kazakhstani racing cyclist. He was a professional racer from 1993 to 2003. He is the brother of Viktor Shefer, who was also a professional cyclist.

Major results

1990
 1st Overall Regio-Tour
 1st Stage 2 Giro delle Regioni
1992
 1st Stages 9 & 10b Settimana Ciclistica Lombarda
 3rd Overall Giro delle Regioni
1993
 10th Overall Tirreno–Adriatico
1994
 3rd Giro della Romagna
1996
 2nd Giro del Friuli
 8th Overall Giro d'Italia
1997
 10th Overall Tour de Romandie
1998
 7th Overall Tour de Suisse
2001
 1st Giro dell'Appennino
 2nd Overall Vuelta a Andalucía
1st Stage 2
 3rd Overall Vuelta a Aragón
 3rd Prueba Villafranca de Ordizia
2002
 1st Stage 2 Vuelta a Andalucía
 1st Giro di Toscana
2003
 3rd La Flèche Wallonne

References

External links
 

Kazakhstani male cyclists
Cycling coaches
1971 births
Living people
Sportspeople from Almaty
Cyclists at the 1996 Summer Olympics
Cyclists at the 2000 Summer Olympics
Olympic cyclists of Kazakhstan
Kazakhstani people of Russian descent
20th-century Kazakhstani people
21st-century Kazakhstani people